The First Javier Fernández government was the first regional government of Asturias led by President Javier Fernández. It was formed in May 2012 after the regional election.

Investiture

Council of Government

References

Cabinets of Asturias
Cabinets established in 2012
Cabinets disestablished in 2015